HNLMS Van Speijk (K3, later F805) was a  sloop, designed in the late 1930s to replace the aging s of the Royal Netherlands Navy. Incomplete at the start of the German invasion of the Netherlands and not yet launched, K3 was found undamaged by the German forces. The Kriegsmarine ordered her completion, then commissioned her for service in Norwegian and German home waters.

After the war she was repaired at the Rijkswerf at Amsterdam, then entered Dutch service as the frigate Van Speijk (F805). She mainly served in the Dutch West Indies until she was scrapped in 1960.

1941 ships
Ships built in Rotterdam
Frigates of the Royal Netherlands Navy
Naval ships of the Netherlands captured by Germany during World War II
World War II naval ships of Germany